An habitation à loyer modéré (HLM), is a form of low-income housing in France, Algeria, Senegal, and Quebec. It may be public or private, with rent subsidies.

HLMs constitute 16% of all housing in France. There are approximately four million such residences, housing an estimated 10 million people. The standard of living in the HLM housing projects is often the lowest in the country.

72% of French HLMs built before 2001 (and 95% of those built between 2001 and 2011) are small buildings or individual houses. The average size of buildings is 20 apartments. Construction of HLM is mainly financed by funds collected on Livret A, a type of savings account regulated by the Caisse des dépôts et consignations. In 2011, the French people have placed 280 billion euros on this type of savings account.

History 

The HLM system was created in 1950 in response to France's postwar housing crisis. The low level of construction during and between the two world wars, the rural exodus that had started to take place in France (directed mainly at Île-de-France, the Paris region) and the baby boom,  contributed to a deficit of an estimated four million residences. Eugène Claudius-Petit, the Minister for Reconstruction and Urbanisation, promoted a scheme of massive construction of socially subsidised residences to address this problem. The new system took its foundations from the HBM ( – "inexpensive housing") system, which had been created in 1889 and financed mainly by charitable sources rather than the state.

The level of social construction did not significantly rise until minister Pierre Courant launched an ambitious plan in 1956, warranted by the increased rate of immigration from France's former colonies. Courant's plan had the goal of construction of at least 240,000 residences each year, and it was an unexpected success: from 1956 on, there were more than 300,000 new residences built annually, with a good number of them HLM. In 1964, there were 95,000 new HLM apartments. The new, large apartment buildings were perfectly rectangular, to allow a crane to roll along a track and place components on both sides of the building simultaneously, saving both time and effort.

The greatest increase in the number of HLMs came in the late 1960s and early 1970s, when many planned communities, or ZUP (: "priority urbanisation zones") were constructed. They were built mostly in the suburbs of Paris. A total of 195 ZUP were created, producing over two million new, mostly HLM, residences.

The emphasis shifted to improving the standard of living in the residences already in existence. In 1968, for example, only 41% of the HLM apartments had toilet and sanitary facilities. By the end of the 1970s, the figure had risen to about 80%. New HLM sites, with more rooms per residence, were built in smaller cities and towns, and numerous programmes were launched to combat poverty, unemployment and delinquency in ZUP communities. In 2001, each HLM residence had, on average, 2.4 persons living in it (compared to 3.2 in 1954), four rooms (three in 1954), and 96% of all HLM apartments had toilet and sanitary facilities, compared to only 10% in 1954.

See also
Public housing
Housing estate
Affordable housing
Subsidized housing
Subsidized housing in the United States
Section 8 (USA)
Panelák and Sídlisko (Czech Republic and Slovakia)
Khrushchyovka (Former Soviet Union)
Plattenbau (Germany)
Million Programme (Sweden)
Panelház (Hungary)
Council Housing (UK)
 ("new town")
Banlieue
Housing Development Board (Singapore)

References

External links 
  at Cour des Comptes (in French)

Welfare in France
Public housing
Residential buildings in France